Beyond the Reef  is a 1981 American adventure film directed by Frank C. Clarke and written by Louis LaRusso II and James Carabatsos. The film stars Dayton Ka'ne, Maren Jensen, Kathleen Swan, Keahi Farden, Oliverio Maciel Diaz, George Tapare, David Nakuna, Robert Atamu and Bob Spiegel.

Cast
Dayton Ka'ne as Tikoyo
Maren Jensen as Diana
Kathleen Swan as Milly
Keahi Farden as Jeff
Oliverio Maciel Diaz as Manidu
George Tapare as The Hawaiian
David Nakuna as Mischima
Robert Atamu as Maku
Bob Spiegel as Turpin
Maui Temaui as Milly's Boyfriend
Teriitehu Star as Grandfather
Joseph Ka'ne as Tikoyo as a child
Titaua Castel as Diana as a child
Andre Garnier as Jeff as a child

References

External links
 
 

American adventure films
1981 films
1981 adventure films
Universal Pictures films
Films produced by Raffaella De Laurentiis
1980s English-language films
1980s American films